The World Confederation of Businesses (WORLDCOB) was founded on September 9, 2004, in the city of Houston, Texas, in the United States of America, under the name of MPBM, Co. Authorization was requested for the use of the name World Confederation of Businesses as the DBA (trade name) of MPBM Co. WORLDCOB has a governing body consisting of the chairman, vice chairman, and the board of directors, made up of a multi-disciplinary team of professionals of different nationalities, all with experience in the field of business consultancy and advisory. The main offices are set up in Houston and Lima, Peru. Founded by organization president Jesus Moran.

WORLDCOB is a participant of the United Nation Global Compact since 2008.

Bizz Awards

WORLDCOB is the awarding body of the Bizz Awards, founded in 2005. The Bizz Awards ceremony was hosted in Houston in 2005, New York City in 2006, Punta Cana in 2007, Panama City in 2008, Cuzco, Peru in 2009, Houston again in 2010, Rome in 2011, and in the Bahamas in 2012, as well as in Dubai, Los Cabos and Paris in 2013, Abu Dhabi, Hawaii, Venice in 2014, Muscat, Las Vegas, Athens in 2015, Marrakesh, Washington D.C. and Monte Carlo in 2016,  Dubai, St. Thomas and Bucharest in 2017, Hong Kong, Miami Beach and Prague in 2018. The award takes place in three different cities each year, one for the Europe, one for Americas, and the one for the region of Asia, Middle East and Africa. Until 2006, the award ceremony was accompanied by a business fair, where organization members presented their businesses. The fair was called the ExpoBizz business forum.

WORLDCOB-CSR 

Since 2011 the organization has also been the certifying body for the WORLDCOB certification in corporate social responsibility WORLDCOB-CSR. The certification lasts for a single year, and is determined after an audit of corporate documents by the organization. The organization states that it has over 3000 members in over 130 countries. The organization also launched a business-to-business online platform in 2009, where members contact each other and conduct various business transactions. The congress also holds the CSR Workshop Tour.  

The organization has also developed WORLDCOB-CSR.2011.03 STANDARD CERTIFICATION, an International Standard which is validated by the British Standard Institute.

In 2019, the organization announced launching of Worldcob Trust Seal (WTS).

References

Organizations based in Houston